Francis Jonathan Berry (born 11 September 1953 in Vancouver, British Columbia) is a Canadian International Correspondence Chess Grandmaster, a FIDE International Arbiter, a FIDE Master (FM) over-the-board, and a chess journalist and author. He is the only Canadian to hold international titles for over-the-board chess, correspondence chess, and chess arbiter.

Chess over the board
Berry represented the University of British Columbia at the Pan American Intercollegiate Team Chess Championships, Montreal 1969, and graduated from that institution in 1973.

Berry had a solid result of tied fourth as a 16-year-old, with 6.5/10, at the 1970 Canadian Open Chess Championship, in St. John's; the event was won by Danish Grandmaster Bent Larsen. He placed third in the 1970 Junior Canadian Chess Championship, held in Toronto, with 5.5/9. Berry played his first Closed Canadian Chess Championship at Toronto 1972, and finished in the middle of a strong field, scoring 8.5/17; the winner was Peter Biyiasas. He was of National Master strength by this time. He tied for third place at the 1972 Canadian Junior Championship in London, Ontario, with 6/9. Berry won the 1974 Vancouver City Closed Championship with 7/8, and also won the 1974 Mexican Open Championship at Guadalajara with 7.5/8. In 1975, Berry scored 9/15 at the Canadian Closed / Zonal in Calgary, Alberta, missing the standard for International Master by only one point; Biyiasas repeated as champion. Berry scored 7.5/10 in the 1976 Canadian Open Chess Championship in Toronto, Ontario. Berry represented Canada at the 1977 Pan American Individual Championship at Santa Cruz, Bolivia, placing sixth.

He had a below average result of 5.5/15 at the 1978 Canadian Closed / Zonal in Toronto. Filling in at the absolute last minute on the Canadian team for the 1982 Lucerne Chess Olympiad, because of a family emergency with one of the selected players, and with no other Master able to answer the call, he made the trans-atlantic trip, played two games on the second reserve board, and drew both of them. Berry was at around 50 per cent in each of his next four Canadian Championship Zonals: 7/15 at Ottawa (1984); 8/15 at Hamilton, Ontario (1994); 4.5/9 at Brantford, Ontario (1999); and 5.5/11 at Richmond, British Columbia (2002).

Since returning to Canada's west coast in the mid-1980s, he has been champion of British Columbia three times: in 1994, in 2000 (first equal), and in 2006 (first equal). He was awarded the FIDE Master title by FIDE, the World Chess Federation, in 1984. Berry, by then living in Nanaimo, British Columbia, scored 5.5/9 at the London, England International II in 1997.

Berry also plays simultaneous blindfold chess and in 2004 played 12 games, tying the world record for players over the age of 50, scoring +9=2-1.

Correspondence chess
Berry was just into his teens when started playing correspondence chess in 1967. He qualified for his first Canadian Championship (K33) in 1976-78, placing third with 10/13. He won K34 (1977–78) with 7/8, and K36 (1979–81) with 7.5/9. In the 60th Anniversary International tournament of the Canadian Correspondence Chess Association (CCCA), from 1981–1985, he placed equal second, with 10/14. In the 3/4 finals for the 13th World Correspondence Chess Championship, running from 1984–89, he scored 9/13, and qualified for the finals, where he scored 6/16, for 13th place. Berry was awarded the title of International Grandmaster of Correspondence Chess by the International Correspondence Chess Federation in 1985. Representing Canada on board two in the XI Correspondence Olympiad, he scored 7/9 in the preliminaries, helping Canada to qualify for the finals; there, again on board two, he scored 5/12.

Chess arbiter
Berry began helping to run tournaments in his mid-teens. He was in Mexico in 1973 on vacation when he was asked to direct the Mexican Zonal qualifier, which he did successfully. He successfully ran the first Pan-American Individual Championship at Winnipeg, Manitoba, 1974, where his bilingual skills in English and Spanish proved very helpful. He directed the 1974 Canadian Junior Championship in Vancouver. Berry directed Vancouver 1975, an International tournament with 320 players, which was won by Paul Keres; it was Keres' last victory before he died a few weeks later. Based upon those four major events, Berry was awarded the title of International Arbiter by FIDE in 1975, at the age of only 22, the youngest ever (a record since broken).

Berry directed the Grand Manan International 1984. He also became involved at the Olympiad level later that same year, in Thessaloniki. He has returned to the Olympiad in 1996 Yerevan, 2000 Istanbul, and 2004 Calvià. The 1988 World Chess Festival, Saint John, New Brunswick, was the most ambitious chess event ever held in Canada; it had seven Candidates' matches, two strong International Opens, several Class tournaments, and the World Blitz Championship. Berry was an assistant arbiter for the Candidates' matches. Berry helped to run the 1988 World Rapid Championships in Mazatlán. From 1994-99, Berry was the head Arbiter for the North Bay International Open series of six tournaments, which averaged over 250 players. Berry was the head arbiter for the 25th anniversary Paul Keres Memorial Tournament, Vancouver 2000. Berry was an assistant arbiter at the U.S. Chess Championship, Seattle, in 2002 and 2003.

He has been in charge of three Canadian Open Chess Championship: at Winnipeg 1986; at Kapuskasing 2003 (where he introduced an innovative pairing system, the 'Kap' system); and at Ottawa 2007, which saw a record 22 Grandmasters participate, and where he utilized the "Capelle la Grande" pairing system, its first use in Canada. Berry is arguably Canada's most experienced arbiter, both in length of service and in variety of top events run. However, Berry has drawn some criticism in certain circles, for introducing incredibly complex pairing systems which are often difficult for participants to understand.

Chess administrator, editor, columnist, and author
While still in university, Berry became the President of the British Columbia Chess Federation. He was hired as the Executive Director of the Chess Federation of Canada in 1975, as well as the Editor of the Federation's magazine CFC Bulletin (later called Chess Canada).  The magazine became well respected among the international chess community. Berry served as Executive Director and Editor until 1983. Berry has continued to write occasionally for Chess Canada in the years since.

Berry became the chess columnist for The Globe and Mail, Canada's national newspaper, in 1981, and has held that post since, writing a Saturday column each week, which usually focuses on Canadian and world chess news, a well-annotated game from high-class play, and some insightful commentary. The column is written in a general-interest style, yet also appeals to serious players. Berry is approaching 1,500 columns.

Berry served as Technical Editor about 15 years for the magazine Inside Chess, founded and edited out of Seattle by Grandmaster Yasser Seirawan. He wrote the book Diamond Dust, the tournament book of the CCCA's 60th anniversary tournament, and The Pocket Guide to Chess. He served as technical and layout editor for the Duncan Suttles chess project, Chess on the Edge, published in three volumes in 2008. He was inducted into the Canadian Chess Hall of Fame in 2001.

References

External links
 
 
 
 
 

1953 births
Living people
Canadian chess players
Canadian chess writers
Canadian non-fiction writers
Correspondence chess grandmasters
Chess FIDE Masters
Chess arbiters
University of British Columbia alumni
Sportspeople from Vancouver
Writers from Vancouver